The Rossbode Glacier is a 3.5 km long glacier (2005) situated in the Pennine Alps in the canton of Valais in Switzerland. In 1973 it had an area of 1.87 km².

See also
List of glaciers in Switzerland
Swiss Alps

External links
Swiss glacier monitoring network
 Rossbode Glacier on Swiss Map

Glaciers of Valais